The Individual normal hill/10 km event of the FIS Nordic World Ski Championships 2015 was held on 20 February 2015.

Results

Ski jumping
The ski jumping part was scheduled at 10:00, but was postponed until 13:30.

Cross-country skiing
The cross-country skiing part was held at 16:00.

References

Individual normal hill 10 km